Steven Ross (born 29 August 1993) is a Scottish professional footballer who plays for Buckie Thistle as a striker.

Career

Ross County
A member of Ross County's youth squad, Ross was sent out on loan during the 2011–12 season to Highland Football League sides Brora Rangers and Forres Mechanics to gain first team experience. On his return from his loans he signed a one-year contract extension, extending his stay until May 2013.

On 29 September 2012, he made his first team debut, coming on as an 87th-minute substitute in a Scottish Premier League match against St Mirren, replacing Iain Vigurs in a 5–4 defeat. His first start came on 20 October, in a 3–2 win over Hibernian. Ross scored his first goal in senior football on 3 November 2012, in a 2–1 win against Aberdeen.

On 31 January 2014, Ross returned for a second loan spell at Brora Rangers.

He joined Dumbarton on 26 August 2015 He was allowed to leave the club at the end of his short-term deal after travelling became an issue.

Highland League
On 21 September 2016, Ross signed for Highland League club Brora Rangers on a 
one-year contract. Despite scoring 24 goals in the 2016–17 season, he left the club for Buckie Thistle in June 2017.

Career statistics

Personal life
His brother Ryan Ross is also a footballer with Ross County.

References

1993 births
Living people
Scottish footballers
Association football forwards
Ross County F.C. players
Brora Rangers F.C. players
Dumbarton F.C. players
Forres Mechanics F.C. players
Buckie Thistle F.C. players
Highland Football League players
Scottish Premier League players
Scottish Professional Football League players
Footballers from Inverness